Albert Fish (1870–1936) was an American serial killer.

Albert Fish may also refer to:

Albert Fish (film), a 2007 biographical documentary film about the serial killer
Albert Fish (politician) (1922–2006), Canadian Member of Parliament

See also
Albert Fisher (disambiguation)
 Bert Fish